Harry Peters (ca. 1788 – 1870) was a merchant and political figure in the province of New Brunswick, Canada. He represented the city of Saint John in the Legislative Assembly of New Brunswick from 1816 to 1828.

He was the son of James Peters and Margaret Lester. Peters was a merchant in Saint John. He replaced Ward Chipman, Jr. as speaker for the legislature in 1826. Peters served as a member of the Legislative Council of New Brunswick from 1828 to 1843 and was a member of the Executive Council from 1828 to 1832. He later moved to Gagetown where he died at the age of 82.

His brother Charles Jeffery served as Attorney General and his brother Benjamin Lester became mayor of Saint John.

The community of Petersville, later expropriated during the expansion of CFB Gagetown, was named in his honour.

References

External links 
 Foot-prints, or, Incidents in early history of New Brunswick : 1783-1883, JW Lawrence (1883)

1870 deaths
Businesspeople from Saint John, New Brunswick
Members of the Legislative Assembly of New Brunswick
Speakers of the Legislative Assembly of New Brunswick
Members of the Legislative Council of New Brunswick
Members of the Executive Council of New Brunswick
Colony of New Brunswick people
Year of birth uncertain